The 1946 U.S. Open was the 46th U.S. Open, held June 12–16 at Canterbury Golf Club in Beachwood, Ohio, a suburb east of Cleveland. In the first U.S. Open since 1941, Lloyd Mangrum, a World War II veteran and recipient of two Purple Hearts, defeated Byron Nelson and Vic Ghezzi in 36 playoff holes to win his only major title.

Nelson's caddie possibly cost Nelson the championship in the third round when he accidentally kicked Nelson's ball; Nelson was assessed a one stroke penalty. Two months after the championship, Nelson announced his retirement from the tour at age 34, though he continued to play at the Masters through 1966. He also played twice again at the U.S. Open (1949 and 1955), and once at the British Open in 1955.

The purse was $8,000 with a winner's share of $1,500. The three participants received a playoff bonus of $333 each.

This was the last playoff at the U.S. Open that ended in a tie without sudden-death. The next dozen 18-hole full round playoffs determined a winner without the need for extra holes. The first time sudden-death was used for the 91st hole was in 1990, Hale Irwin's third title. It was needed again in 1994 and 2008.

This was the second U.S. Open at Canterbury in six years; the 1940 edition was won by Lawson Little. It later hosted the PGA Championship in 1973, won by Jack Nicklaus.

Past champions in the field

Made the cut 

Source:

Missed the cut 

Source:

Round summaries

First round
Thursday, June 13, 1946

Source:

Second round
Friday, June 14, 1946

Source:

Third round
Saturday, June 15, 1946 (morning)

Source:

Final round
Saturday, June 15, 1946 (afternoon)

Nelson began the final round with a one-stroke lead over Mangrum and Ghezzi. Ghezzi was the first to finish and carded a 72 and a 284 total. Nelson and Mangrum were playing together, and Nelson had a two-stroke advantage with three holes remaining. But after bogeys at his final two holes, combined with two pars by Mangrum, Nelson fell back into a tie and forced a three-way playoff.

Source:

Playoff 
Sunday, June 16, 1946

All three players shot even-par 72 during the first 18 holes on Sunday morning, which forced another 18-hole playoff in the afternoon, as there was no sudden-death playoff at the time. At the 9th, Mangrum nearly shot himself out of contention with an out of bounds tee shot, but a  putt for bogey allowed him to minimize the damage. Nelson and Ghezzi were tied at the turn, with Mangrum two back. But Mangrum then collected two birdies, while Nelson bogeyed 13 and Ghezzi recorded bogeys at 14 and 15. Mangrum took a two-stroke lead with a birdie at 16, and despite a bogey-bogey finish, his 72 was good enough to hold off Nelson and Ghezzi by a stroke.

Prize money includes $333 playoff bonus for each.

Scorecards
Morning round

Afternoon round

Cumulative playoff scores, relative to par
{|class="wikitable" span = 50 style="font-size:85%;
|-
|style="background: Pink;" width=10|
|Birdie
|style="background: PaleGreen;" width=10|
|Bogey
|}
Source:

References

External links
USGA Championship Database

U.S. Open (golf)
Golf in Ohio
Beachwood, Ohio
U.S. Open
U.S. Open
U.S. Open
U.S. Open